The enzyme sucrose-phosphatase (EC 3.1.3.24) catalyzes the reaction

sucrose 6F-phosphate + H2O  sucrose + phosphate

This enzyme belongs to the family of hydrolases, specifically those acting on phosphoric monoester bonds.  The systematic name of this enzyme class is sucrose-6F-phosphate phosphohydrolase. Other names in common use include sucrose 6-phosphate hydrolase, sucrose-phosphate hydrolase, sucrose-phosphate phosphohydrolase, and sucrose-6-phosphatase.  This enzyme participates in starch and sucrose metabolism.

Structural studies

References

 

EC 3.1.3
Enzymes of known structure